The Sidney class consisted of two roll-on/roll-off ferries, Queen of Sidney and Queen of Tsawwassen, built for the British Columbia Ferry Corporation in service from 1960 to 2008. The design for the ships was based on the ferry  with changes made to accommodate loading of vehicles through the bow of the vessel. Both vessels serviced different routes throughout their service lives.

Design and description

Design of the two roll-on/roll-off ferries, Queen of Sidney and Queen of Tsawwassen, was based on a ferry that was under construction for Black Ball Transport,  for international service along the British Columbia and Washington coasts. Cohos design was altered by the original naval architect Philip F. Spaulding and his Canadian partner Arthur McLaren to allow the Canadian vessels to accept vehicle loading at both bow and stern. As built, the vessels had a car capacity of 108, however in 1971, additional platforms were added to the car decks increasing capacity to 138.

Ships

Construction and career
In 1958, the premier of British Columbia W.A.C. Bennett authorised the creation of a provincial ferry service. The new service, known as the British Columbia Ferry Corporation ordered two ships constructed from shipyards in British Columbia. Sidney was ordered from Victoria Machinery Depot in Victoria, with the yard number 85 and was laid down on May 9, 1959. The vessel was launched on October 6, 1959 and completed in May 1960. Tsawwassen was built by Burrard Dry Dock in Vancouver with the yard number 309 and was laid down on May 9, 1959. The ferry was launched on November 28, 1959 and completed in May 1960. Both ships began service on June 15, 1960 servicing two terminals linking Victoria and Vancouver. In 1962, Tsawwassen was renamed Queen of Tsawwassen and in 1963, Sidney was renamed Queen of Sidney. This was due to change in fleetwide naming policy based on CP Ships naming their vessels "Princess". As a result, the larger vessels of the British Columbia Ferries fleet would have "Queen" placed in front of their original names and the smaller ones have it added to the end.
 
The two ships spent almost all of their service life identical to when they were constructed, except for an expansion of the restaurant areas, due to unexpected food demand shortly after they commenced service.

Queen of Sidney was retired in November 2000. The decommissioned ferry was sold to Bob and Gerald Tapp for CAN$100,000 in 2002 and renamed Bad Adventure. The ship was sent to a shipyard in Mission, British Columbia, where it has sat ever since. Queen of Tsawwassen was taken out of service in 2007. This was due to the ship no longer capable of meeting government regulations and a refit being cost prohibitive. An  was ordered to replace the ship. The vessel was put up for sale in 2008.

Citations

References

External links
 In 2014 Queen of Sidney can be seen here 

 
1960 ships
Ships built in British Columbia
Ferry classes